Matti Paatelainen (born 17 June 1944) is a Finnish former international footballer who played as a striker.

Career
Paatelainen earned 47 caps for Finland, scoring eleven goals, between 1970 and 1977. He played club football at Urho, HPS, HIFK and FC Haka. He was Mestaruussarja top scorer in 1970, 1972, 1976 and 1977

He appeared in nine FIFA World Cup qualifying matches, scoring once.

Personal life
Paatelainen has three sons who all have played professional football - Mixu, Mikko and Markus.

References

1944 births
Living people
Finnish footballers
Finland international footballers
Finnish football managers
FC Haka players
HIFK Fotboll players
Association football forwards
Mestaruussarja players
People from Äänekoski
Sportspeople from Central Finland